The Africa Movie Academy Award for Best Director is an annual merit by the Africa Film Academy to recognise the best director of an African film for the year.

References

Awards for best director
Best Director Africa Movie Academy Award winners
Africa Movie Academy Awards